The Sovereign Union (Icelandic: Samtök Fullveldissinna) is an Icelandic political organization founded on 12 May 2009. Sometimes it is also referred to as the Coalition for the Sovereignty of Iceland, and during the four months from January - April 2009 it was also referred to as the L-List of Sovereignty Supporters - although at that point of time it was not established as a party but only worked as a coalition of independent candidates. Ahead of the establishment of the party, the founders of the party had attempted to run for the Althing in the 2009 Icelandic parliamentary election, but as opinion polls did not show sufficient support for election, they decided to withdraw from the elections only three weeks ahead of the election day. Candidates back then for the "party like" list were Bjarni Harðarson (a previous MP of Progressive Party), and Þórhallur Heimisson (a priest).

Among the more notable projects of the party, is the petition it organised against the Icesave-agreement in 2011.

References

External links
 Sovereign Union website
 Sovereign Union blog

Civic nationalism
Icelandic nationalism
Political parties established in 2009
Defunct political parties in Iceland
Political organizations based in Iceland
Eurosceptic parties in Iceland
2009 establishments in Iceland